Brondesbury Park is a suburb and electoral ward of the London Borough of Brent. It is the part of Brondesbury which is not interwoven with Kilburn due to the naming of a major tube station (Kilburn) and is centred on Brondesbury Park railway station and the street, an avenue, which shares its name. The area has a number of open spaces, primarily Queen's Park and Tiverton Green.

Humphry Repton's Brondesbury Park 

Brondesbury Park is an alternate name for its manor, a specially empowered division of the large parish of Willesden as one of its eight prebends. The manor house is long-demolished.  Landscape designer Humphry Repton transformed the focal 10 acres of Brondesbury Park, a varying demense but in most years 54 acres in the 18th and 19th century, when he designed the garden. The house had been bought by his client Lady (Sarah) Salusbury's in 1789. Repton produced one of his famous 'Red Books' for the manor house, which has been republished, along with his Red Book for Glemham Hall in Suffolk.

Repton planned a garden with views across London, but Lady Salusbury wanted shade rather than sweeping views. The grounds of Lady Salusbury's house only amounted to 10 acres. Repton found very few trees, so had planted hundreds of mature trees and shrubs. Lady Salusbury was so delighted with the work that she gave Repton a bonus of £50.

Some street names allude to the inclosed private park (garden) dominating the north of the area and notable manorial owners. The street named Brondesbury Park leads into Salusbury Road.

Repton also worked on Wembley Park including what became Wembley Stadium today in the same borough.

Politics
The ward returns two councillors to sit on Brent Council.

After the 2022 council election the two elected councillors are from the Labour Party, Erica Gbajumo and Ryan Hack.

In the 2006 local elections Brondesbury Park was won by the Liberal Democrats, who climbed from third place in 2002 to take all three seats.  This was widely attributed to the defection of campaigner Carol Shaw, who left the Conservatives to join the Liberal Democrats shortly before the Brent East by-election in 2003. The party retained the seats at the 2010 elections.

Since the 2010 general election, the ward has formed part of the new seat of Hampstead and Kilburn.

Surrounding areas

 Willesden, to the north-west
 Mapesbury, to the north (where used)
 Kilburn / Brondesbury, to the east.  Kilburn is traditionally the linear settlement along the A5 there.
 Queen's Park, to the south
 Kensal Green and Harlesden, to the west

References

External links
Brondesbury Park Ward Facts and figures from Brent Council

Areas of London
Districts of the London Borough of Brent
Gardens by Humphry Repton